Hendrik Adriaan "Rik" Toonen (born May 21, 1954 in Arnhem) is a former water polo player from the Netherlands, who won the bronze medal with the Dutch Men's Team at the 1976 Summer Olympics in Montreal, Canada.

See also
 List of Olympic medalists in water polo (men)

External links
 

1954 births
Living people
Dutch male water polo players
Olympic bronze medalists for the Netherlands in water polo
Water polo players at the 1976 Summer Olympics
Sportspeople from Arnhem
Medalists at the 1976 Summer Olympics
20th-century Dutch people